Pallasea is a genus of Pallaseidae.

The genus was described in 1862 by C. S. Bate.

The species from this genus are found in Baikal Lake and in some lakes in Europe.

Species:
 Pallasea angarensis Dorogostaisky, 1917
 Pallasea cancellus (Pallas, 1772)
 Pallasea gerstfeldtii (Dybowsky, 1874)

References

Gammaridea